S. salicifolia may refer to:
 Spiraea salicifolia, the bridewort spiraea, a plant species in the genus Spiraea
 Stevia salicifolia, a plant species in the genus Stevia

See also
 Salicifolia (disambiguation)